Pantanoso Creek (meaning "swampy creek") is a Uruguayan stream, crossing Montevideo Department. It flows into the Bay of Montevideo and then into the Río de la Plata.

It is one of the most contaminated water streams in the country.

See also
List of rivers of Uruguay

References

Rivers of Uruguay
Rivers of Montevideo Department